3,4-Divanillyltetrahydrofuran is a lignan found in an Urtica dioica (stinging nettle) subspecies.  This same compound may also be found in other lignan-containing plant sources such as Linum usitatissimum (flax seed).

The compound has been found to occupy binding sites of sex hormone-binding globulin (SHBG), thereby reducing the ability of SHBG to bind additional steroid hormones such as estrogens and androgens, mostly testosterone and estradiol. Certain extracts of stinging nettle are therefore used by some bodybuilders in an effort to increase free testosterone.

References 

Lignans
Tetrahydrofurans
Urtica